Luis Miguel Barbosa Maia (born April 23, 1971 in Paranhos) is a beach volleyball player from Portugal, who competed in three consecutive Summer Olympics for his native country, starting in 1996. He ended up in fourth place in Atlanta (1996) and in Sydney (2000), alongside João Brenha, after having lost the bronze medal match against the German couple Axel Hager / Jörg Ahmann. He currently plays for Sporting CP.

Playing Partners
João Brenha
Nelson Brizida
Alexandre Silva Afonso
Miguel Soares

References

External links
 Personal website
 
 
 

1971 births
Living people
Beach volleyball players at the 1996 Summer Olympics
Beach volleyball players at the 2000 Summer Olympics
Beach volleyball players at the 2004 Summer Olympics
Portuguese beach volleyball players
Sporting CP volleyball players
Olympic beach volleyball players of Portugal